Abraham Shackelton (1696–1771) was a Quaker schoolmaster. Born in West Yorkshire, he settled and established a school in Ballitore, County Kildare, Ireland. His private boarding school, open to people of any faith, educated boys from France, England, and other foreign countries. He taught Edmund Burke, who became a statesman and philosopher, and Paul Cullen, later the Catholic Archbishop of Dublin.

Personal life

Abraham Shackelton was born at Shackleton House, at Harden, near Bingley, West Yorkshire in England on 27 October 1696. He was the sixth and final child born to (1658–1703) of Keighley and Richard Shackleton (1643–1705). Both of his parents were Quakers (Society of Friends) His father was imprisoned at York Castle for three years because he had not attended church (likely before the Toleration Act 1688). In 1696, Shackleton House became a Quaker meeting-house.

Shackleton came from a family of yeoman farmers. Both of his parents died when he was young; his mother died when he was six years of age and his father followed two years later. Shackelton had a frail constitution as a young man.

He acquired his share of his parents estate at the age of 20, which he sold to brother Roger (1691–1766) and used the money for his education. He studied Latin and became a good prose stylist. Shakelton met Margaret Wilkinson when he worked at David Hall's school, she was the first cousin of the head of the school. She was the daughter of Richard Wilkinson of Knowlbank, Yorkshire. Shackleton and Wilkinson were married on 7 October 1725. Their son Richard was born 28 July 1726. He was educated at his father's school and later became its schoolmaster in 1756. They also had a daughter Elizabeth Raynor.

Margaret died in 1768. Shackleton died 24 June 1771 at Ballitore and was interred at a Quaker graveyard.

Schoolmaster

He qualified to become a schoolmaster at the age of 20, when he learned Latin. He worked at David Hall's school at Skipton, North Yorkshire as an assistant. He moved to Ireland in 1720, after he was recruited by Irish Quakers to become a tutor for the children of William Cooper and John Duckett. The families resided at Cooper's Hill in Queen's County (now County Laois) and Duckett's Grove in County Carlow, Ireland. 

In the neighboring County Kildare, he opened a multi-denominational boarding school at the Quaker village of Ballitore on 1 March 1726. The school took in Irish students, but made the village well known when it attracted students from well-off families in Scotland, England, France, Norway, and Jamaica. 

Over 30 years, Shackleton educated more than 500 boys. Statesman and philosopher Edmund Burke and his brothers were among Shackleton's most famous and able students. Burke, who attended the same time as Shackleton's son Richard, claimed that Shackleton was his most influential teacher. Paul Cullen, later the Catholic Archbishop of Dublin, studied under Shackleton.

His son Richard tookover as schoolmaster in 1756. Local poor sought shelter, food and medicine at Shackelton's house. After retiring as a schoolmaster, he farmed in the village and was an active visitor of Quaker meetings throughout Ireland, including Quaker meetings throughout Leinster, and in 1769 he was a representative at the London Yearly Meeting.

Legacy

Notes

References

1696 births
1711 deaths
People from Bingley
People from County Kildare
Heads of schools in Ireland
Irish schoolteachers
Irish Quakers